Suhayl ibn ʿAmr, also known as Abū Yazīd, was a contemporary of the Islamic prophet Muhammad, and a prominent leader among the Quraysh tribe of Mecca. Clever and articulate, he was known as the Khatib (orator) of his tribe, and his opinion carried great weight among them.

Family 
He was the son of Amr ibn Abd Shams, of the Amir ibn Luayy clan, and Uzza bint Sufyan, from the Umayya clan, both of the Quraysh tribe. He had four half-brothers.
Sakran ibn Amr, whose mother was Hiyah bint Qays al-Khuzaiyah. He was the first husband of Sawdah bint Zam'ah and the father of Abdulrahman.
Hatib, whose mother was Asma bint al-Harith ibn Nawfal. He was the husband of Rayta bint Alqama and the father of Amr.
Sahl, whose mother was also Asma bint al-Harith ibn Nawfal. He was the husband of Safiyya bint Amr ibn Abd al-Wud and the father of Amir.
Sulayt, whose mother was Khawla bint Amr ibn al-Harith. He was the husband of Fatima bint Alqama and father of Salit.

Suhayl is described as a tall, fair-skinned, handsome man of pleasant appearance, though he had a cleft lower lip.

He married three times and had several children.
Fatima bint Abdul-Uzza
Hind bint Suhail, who married Hasan ibn Ali and was the mother of Yaqoub and Abdurrahman.
Umm Kulthum, who married Abu Sabra ibn Abu Ruhm and was the mother of Sa'd, Sabra, Abdullah and Muhammad.
Sahla bint Suhail, who married Abu Hudhayfa ibn 'Utba and was the mother of Muhammad ibn Abi Hudhayfa. 
Fakhita bint Amir ibn Nawfal
Abdullah, who married Layla bint Abdullah and was the father of Umar ibn Abdullah and Ubaydullah.
Al-‘As (later known as Abu Jandal), who married Safiya bint Abd al-Uzza and was the father of Jandal and Abd-Allah.
Al-Hunfa' bint Abu Jahl.
Yazid, who married Ruqayya bint Abdullah ibn Abi Qays and was the father of Abu al-Hasan and Umm al-Hasan.

Early Islam
Suhayl was one of the elders of Mecca in the earliest days of Islam. He was among those tasked with feeding the pilgrims.

He was one of the leaders who refused to protect Muhammad on his return from Ta'if in 620, saying, "Amir ibn Luayy do not give protection against the clans of Kaab," the latter being the majority of the Quraysh.

In 622, the Quraysh heard that some pilgrims from Medina had met with Muhammad at Aqaba and pledged to fight them. Suhayl and some others pursued the Medinans and captured one of their leaders, Sa'd ibn Ubadah. They tied his hands to his neck with his own belt and dragged him by the hair back to Mecca, beating him as they went. Sa'd said that he expected Suhayl to treat him well, but Suhayl delivered "a violent blow in the face". However, when Sa'd called for help, the Quraysh realised he had allies in Mecca and they let him go.

In 624, Suhayl and his son Abdullah set out with the Quraysh army to meet Abu Sufyan's caravan. When they reached Badr, where Muhammad's army was waiting, Abdullah deserted the Quraysh and joined the Muslim side for the Battle of Badr. Suhayl was among those captured and taken prisoner at the battle. Umar offered to knock out his two front teeth so that "his tongue will stick out and he will never be able to speak against you again;" but Muhammad would not allow it. Suhayl was brought to Medina with his hands roped to his neck. He was brought to the house of his former sister-in-law, Sawda, and some disbelievers who call themselves muslims made up false statements stating that Sawda said: "I could hardly contain myself when I saw Abu Yazid in this state and I said, 'O Abu Yazid, you surrendered too readily! You ought to have died a noble death!". Such blasphemous and disbelief words were never reported through strong chain of narrations. The citation is from the book which was written by disbelievers and translated into English by disbelievers as well (Oxford press). The narration regarding this situation is reported in Sunan Abu Dawud 2680 where such disbelief words attributed to Sawda do not exist, and the narration itself is weak.

In due course Mikraz ibn Hafs ibn al-Akhyaf came to negotiate Suhayl's ransom, which Muhammad agreed to take in camels. Since Mikraz did not have the animals with him, he remained in Medina as security while Suhayl returned to Mecca to arrange the payment.

Suhayl was instrumental in concluding the Treaty of Hudaybiyyah in 628. He insisted that the treaty be signed from the Muslim side as Muhammad, son of Abdullah (Muhammad ibn Abdullah) rather than the Prophet Muhammad, saying that the Qurayshi side did not accept his prophethood. Before the writing-up was finished, Suhayl's son Abu Jandal appeared, saying he was a Muslim and wanted to go to Medina. Suhayl slapped his face and reminded Muhammad that they had just agreed that no Meccans would be allowed to desert to Medina. Muhammad concurred, and Abu Jandal had to return to Mecca. Umar walked beside him, offering a sword, which he hoped Abu Jandal would use to kill his father; but Abu Jandal did not take it.

Suhayl joined Ikrimah ibn Abi Jahl in Mecca's final resistance against Muhammad at Khandama Pass. However, the resistance was flattened by Khalid ibn al-Walid's cavalry. When Muhammad entered Mecca as a conqueror, Suhayl converted to Islam along with everyone else. Muhammad gave him a gift of a hundred camels "to win over his heart".

He calmed the Muslims in Mecca after the death of Muhammad.
He participated in the battle of Yarmuk alongside the Muslims.

Death
He died in 639 from the plague epidemic in Imwas, a small village near Jerusalem in Palestine.

References

Companions of the Prophet
Quraysh
7th-century deaths from plague (disease)
639 deaths
556 births